Ayatollah Mohammad Taghi Vaezi (born 1951 in Tehran) is an Iranian Shia cleric, author and politician.  He is a member of the 4th Assembly of Experts from the Zanjan Province electorate. Vaezi won membership with 380,308 votes. He has been imam Jumu'ah for Zanjan in northwest of Iran since 2003. to 2011.

See Also 

 List of members in the Fourth Term of the Council of Experts
List of Ayatollahs

References

People from Tehran
Members of the Assembly of Experts
Iranian Shia clerics
Living people
1951 births